Selkie is a 2000 Australian family fantasy film. It features former Sick Puppies lead singer Shimon Moore.

Plot
Jamie (Shimon Moore) is a typical teenager living the good life: a popular lad, he has a part-time job, is on the football team and is the lead guitarist in a rock band. But all this is threatened when his mum (Celine O'Leary) announces that she has a new job as head scientist at a marine research base.

Forced to uproot and move to a remote island, Jamie soon discovers that all is not as it seems. He begins to notice changes to his body – scales and webbed fingers – things beyond the explanation of teenage changes. Changes which suggest that he is somehow connected to a legendary line of selkies – a magical people from ancient Scotland who have the power to change into seals.

Cast
 Shimon Moore as Jamie Duncan
 Chelsea Bruland as Samantha
 Mariana Rego as Alison Duncan
 Bryan Marshall as Malcolm
 Celine O'Leary as Dr. Iona Duncan
 Elspeth Ballantyne as Loopy Laura
 Michael Habib as Tony Delmarco
 Edmund Pegge as Gordon Harris

Production
It was set and shot in South Australia including Port Noarlunga South beach (“South Port”). The fishing harbor location was filmed at Granite Island off Victor Harbor in South Australia which is about fifty kilometers further south of Port Noarlunga or about one hour's drive from the state's capital city of Adelaide. The visual effects were done by Rising Sun Pictures.

References

External links
 
 Selkie at Urban Cinefile

2000 films
Australian fantasy films
2000s English-language films
Films based on Celtic mythology
Films directed by Donald Crombie
Films shot in Adelaide
Films shot in South Australia
Films set in South Australia
2000s Australian films